Tsai Shing-hsiang (born 31 August 1960) is a Taiwanese fencer. He competed in the individual foil and épée events at the 1984 Summer Olympics.

References

External links
 

1960 births
Living people
Taiwanese male épée fencers
Olympic fencers of Taiwan
Fencers at the 1984 Summer Olympics
Taiwanese male foil fencers